Chisel was an American punk rock band from the United States from 1990 through 1997. In that time, the group released two full-length albums and a compilation of early recordings.

1990-1995: Early years
Chisel began in 1990 on the campus of the University of Notre Dame, when classmates Ted Leo (guitar/vocals), Chris Infante (bass), and John Dugan (drums) began practicing in the basement of a campus dormitory. Leo had played punk shows with bands such as Animal Crackers in New York's all-ages scene and Dugan had drummed with the Washington, D.C. area punk act Indian Summer from the age of fifteen. The band quickly went from playing a covers set (Wire, Misfits, Buzzcocks, Mission of Burma) to playing original songs written by Leo. Chisel began to perform at various college venues in the Midwest and Northeast, visiting clubs such as D.C. Space in Washington and ABC No Rio in New York City.

In 1991, the band released its first single, "Swamp Fox/Spike" b/w "Listen", on Assembly Records, and followed it up with appearances on compilations released by college radio stations WVFI in Notre Dame, Indiana and WPRB in Princeton, New Jersey. In the same year, they recorded a demo tape in Notre Dame's Stanford Hall. In 1992, Infante graduated from college and was replaced on bass by Chris Norborg, who also provided the backing vocal harmonies that soon became integral to Chisel's sound.  It was during this period that the band began to change its style from traditional emo-influenced pop punk that was inspired by contemporaries in Washington, D.C., to more of a mod-influenced band in the vein of the Small Faces and The Jam. In 1994, the band members relocated to Washington where Dugan had been interning with Amnesty International.

1995 - 1997: 8 A.M. All Day
In 1995, Chisel issued an EP with New Jersey's Gern Blandsten label, Nothing New, which included several new songs recorded with Guy Picciotto of Fugazi in his home studio as well as recordings done the previous year in Chicago with Tortoise soundman Casey Rice.  It was followed in 1996 by 8 A.M. All Day, an album of all-new material recorded in the basement studio of Velocity Girl guitarist Archie Moore and produced by the band itself. By this time, Chisel was touring as a support act for bands like Fugazi, Velocity Girl, Blonde Redhead and Tuscadero.  Following the release of 8 A.M. All Day, the band gained a growing following in the rock clubs of New York, Chicago, and Boston.

1997: Set You Free
For its next album, the band enlisted Nicolas Vernhes and his Rare Book Room studio in Williamsburg, Brooklyn to record brand new material. The band first recorded a single, "It's Alright, You're Okay", in the studio and a few months later booked Vernhes for 10 days. Within those ten days, the band tracked and mixed 16 songs. This new set of material found the band incorporating various Britpop influences, horns, Hammond organ, and thicker sonics into its sound. But the band also pared some pieces back to an almost minimalist rock aesthetic to push Leo's increasingly dark, personal lyrics to the fore. At the other end of the spectrum, Norborg contributed lead vocals to his compositions "The Unthinkable Is True," "Oh Dear Friends," and "Morley Timmons".

The band released its second and final LP, Set You Free, in mid-1997, and set off on a well-attended tour with Boston band Karate. Chisel played its last show on 16 May 1997, in Knoxville, TN at the end of its tour. Plans to tour the West Coast and Europe were scrapped.

2022: Re-releases 
On 14 March 2022, Chisel's digital discography was deleted from streaming services. Numero Group announced that were behind it and that they would be re-releasing the Chisel discography, starting with the "It's Alright, You're O.K." b/w "Guns of Meridian Hill" single and would later be ending with an expanded version of Set You Free. On May 10, Numero released an EP titled "All My Kin" featuring remastered versions of the title track and "Rip Off The Gift", both from Set You Free, and a previously unreleased live recording of "The Unthinkable is True". On July 12, the "Innocents Abroad" EP was released, featuring remastered versions of four songs from "Nothing New". On September 12, the "What About Blighty?" single was released, featuring the title track originally from 8 A.M. All Day. On September 30, Numero announced Numero Twenty, a festival celebrating twenty years of Numero Group being active. A slew of reunions were announced for the fest, including Chisel. On November 16, the band announced two additional dates, one staying in California and the other in Chicago.

Discography

EPs and albums

 Nothing New (April 1995; Gern Blandsten)
 8 a.m. All Day (January 1996; Gern Blandsten)
 Set You Free (April 1997; Gern Blandsten)
 All My Kin (May 2022; Numero Group)
 Innocents Abroad (July 2022; Numero Group)
 Live on WTPS, 1997 (November 2022; Numero Group)

Singles
 "Swamp Fox/Spike" b/w "Listen" (September 1991; Assembly Records. Limited 7" release)
 "Spectacles" split with Brian, Colin & Vince (August 1993; Sudden Shame Records)
 "Sunburn" b/w "Little Gidding" "3 O'Clock High" (August 1994; Gern Blandsten)
 "O.T.S." b/w "If You Believe in Christmas Trees" (December 1995; Darla Records)
 "It's Alright. You're O.K." b/w "Guns of Meridian Hill" (February 1997; Gern Blandsten/March 2022; Numero Group)

Compilations
 "Swamp Fox/Spike" on The Jericho Sessions (April 1991; WVFI Radio)
 "Sloth" on Superpowers (1993; Troubleman Unlimited)
 "Dream Bar" on Incubus 1993 (April 1993)
 "Nothing New" on Dog So Large I Cannot See Past It (1997; WPRB Radio)
 "Out for Kicks" on Squirrel (September 1995; Level Records)
 "Six Different Ways" on Give Me the Cure (September 1995; Radiopaque)
 "No Alibis" on Tatterfrock Eight (1996; Jumpjet)
 "Chiefs" on Storm of the Century (February 1997; Sudden Shame Records)
 "Guns of Meridian Hill" on Fort Reno Benefit Compilation (September 1997; Resin Records)
 "Do Go On" on Gern Blandsten - The First Nine Years (2001; Gern Blandsten)
 "The O.T.S." on Darla 100 (2002; Darla Records)

DVDs
 "Spectacles" on Songs for Cassavetes (2000)

References

External links
[ AllMusic Artist Page]
Epitonic page
Band web site as of 2008
Official myspace website

Mod revival groups
American pop punk groups
Punk rock groups from Indiana